Kuala Ketil is a small town in Baling District, Kedah, Malaysia. Kuala Ketil is also known as Kuala Ansotil by locals and residents around the town. Kuala Ketil is situated within the parliamentary constituency of Baling, in south-eastern Kedah. Kuala Ketil is a major economic area of Baling region.

Economy and facilities
Its main core business is industry. This small town plays a role as the supplier for daily needs to the nearby estates.

The boost for Kuala Ketil's economy started in 1993 when the government commenced development of the industrial area, known as Taman Perindustrial Kuala Ketil.

Kuala Ketil has many housing estates; examples are Taman Desa Bidara (which is the largest housing estate in Kuala Ketil) as well as Taman Haji Muslim. Kuala Ketil has two gas stations, Petronas and Shell.

Transportation
Kuala Ketil lies on the main road that connects Baling and Sungai Petani. This road is the major gateway for motorists from Kedah to access the east coast states of Kelantan and Terengganu, alongside highway 4.

External links
Visit http://www.kualaketil.com for more information about Kuala Ketil town.

Baling District
Towns in Kedah